Michel Le Bris (1 February 1944 – 30 January 2021) was a French writer.

Career
He was a specialist on Robert Louis Stevenson. He was the organizer of the Saint-Malo literary festival "Astonishing Voyageurs" which he started in 1990.

References

1944 births
2021 deaths
French writers